Sergio Codognato (born April 3, 1944 in Limbiate) is an Italian association football coach and former professional player who played as a defender. He played in Serie A for Inter and Catania.

References

1944 births
Living people
Italian footballers
Association football defenders
Serie A players
Serie B players
Inter Milan players
Catania S.S.D. players
U.S. Alessandria Calcio 1912 players
U.S. Salernitana 1919 players
Ravenna F.C. players
Modena F.C. players
Cosenza Calcio 1914 players
Italian football managers
Cosenza Calcio managers
S.E.F. Torres 1903 players